Dejo Fayemi was a Nigerian footballer.

Fayemi was part of the team that unsuccessfully attempted to qualify for the 1960 Summer Olympics.

He scored Nigeria's first ever goal in a World Cup qualifier, it came against Ghana on 28 August 1960 in a 4-1 loss.

References 

1933 births
2016 deaths
Nigerian footballers
Nigeria international footballers
Association footballers not categorized by position